Jack Bandeira is an English actor. He is known for his roles in television series Noughts + Crosses, Young Wallander, Vera, Silent Witness, Holby City, Happy Valley and Lockwood & Co. Then he appeared in After Ever Happy, The Silent Twins, Venom: Let There Be Carnage and My Policeman.

Career
In 2013 at age nineteen he made his debut in Middleton as Keith Tate. After that he appeared in many roles in different TV series Holby City, Vera, The Witcher, Sex Education and Noughts + Crosses. He also appeared in Cold Courage, Young Wallander, and Silent Witness.

He also appeared in films The Duke, Gunpowder Milkshake, Venom: Let There Be Carnage, The Silent Twins, After Ever Happy and My Policeman.

Filmography

Television

Film

Video games

References

External links
 

1994 births
21st-century English male actors
Living people
English male film actors
English male television actors
English male video game actors
Male actors from London
English male voice actors